Lists of Hot 100 number-one singles of 2009 are lists of singles released in 2009 as ranked by Billboard magazine in the United States and associated magazines in other countries.

Lists

 List of Billboard Hot 100 number-one singles of 2009
 List of Hot 100 number-one singles of 2009 (Japan)
 List of Canadian Hot 100 number-one singles of 2009
 List of Hot 100 number-one singles of 2009 (Brazil)

See also 
 Lists of number-one songs